In Darkest Smaland (Swedish: I mörkaste Småland) is a 1943 Swedish comedy film directed by Schamyl Bauman and starring Sigurd Wallén, Emil Fjellström and Gull Natorp. It was shot at the Centrumateljéerna Studios in Stockholm. The film's sets were designed by the art director Allan Egnell.

Cast
 Sigurd Wallén as 	Johannes / Narrator
 Emil Fjellström as Cornelius
 Gull Natorp as	Kristin
 Eivor Landström as Mari
 Peter Höglund as 	Alfred
 Gideon Wahlberg as Policeman
 Theodor Berthels as	Erkas 
 Carl Barcklind as	Judge
 Carl Hagman as 	Dr. Lind
 John Botvid as 	Johannes' father
 Wiktor Andersson as	Const. Söderkvist 
 Nils Hallberg as 	Erkas' son
 Lennart Pilotti as	Erkas' son 
 Erik A. Petschler asCircus manager
 Ernst Brunman as	Magnus
 Kaj Hjelm as 	Johannes' son
 Albin Erlandson as Lars-Ola 
 Ingemar Holde as Karlsson
 Artur Cederborgh as 	Station master
 Arne Lindblad as 	Circus staff
 Birger Sahlberg as Merchant
 Torsten Hillberg as Lieutenant at Ränneslätt
 Aurore Palmgren as 	Old woman
 Mona Geijer-Falkner as	Workhouse inmate
 Wilma Malmlöf as 	Woman at the poor-house 
 Lisa Wirström as 	Woman at the poor-house
 Anna-Stina Wåglund as 	Lady at the market
 Gudrun Folmer-Hansen as	Circus cashier
  Knut Frankman as 	Man at the poor-house
 Rudolf Svensson as 	Circus athlete
 Hartwig Fock as 	Man buying butter at the market
 Karl Erik Flens as	Conscript
 Bror Abelli as	Vicar
 Folke Algotsson as Man at the market 
 Gunnar Almqvist as 	Man in courtroom 
 Margit Andelius as 	Telephone operator 
 Olga Andersson as 	Mrs. Lind 
 Julia Cæsar as 	Lady at the dance 
 John Elfström as Fighter at the dance
 Millan Fjellström as	Woman outside the poor-house 
 Jack Gill as 	Accordion player
 Hjördis Gille as	Emma 
 Viktor Haak as	Man at the dance
 Carl Harald as 	Man at the market
 Carin Lundquist as 	Woman at the market 
 Hugo Lundström as Man outside the poor-house 
 Curt Löwgren as 	Conscript 
 John Melin as 	Innkeeper
 Gösta Qvist as 	Karlsson 
 Gabriel Rosén as 	Corporal 
 Jan-Olof Rydqvist as 	Johannes' second son 
 Victor Thorén as Schoolteacher

References

Bibliography 
 Wallengren, Ann-Kristin.  Welcome Home Mr Swanson: Swedish Emigrants and Swedishness on Film. Nordic Academic Press, 2014.

External links 
 

1943 films
1943 comedy films
Swedish comedy films
1940s Swedish-language films
Films directed by Schamyl Bauman
1940s Swedish films